is a Japanese footballer who is a Japanese coach and a former professional soccer player.

External links
 Rochester Rhinos bio

1986 births
Living people
Japanese footballers
Japanese expatriate footballers
Colorado Rapids U-23 players
Portland Timbers U23s players
Sevilla FC Puerto Rico players
FB Gulbene players
Rochester New York FC players
Real Colorado Foxes players
Expatriate soccer players in the United States
Expatriate footballers in Puerto Rico
Expatriate footballers in Latvia
Japanese expatriate sportspeople in Latvia
USL League Two players
USL Championship players
Association football midfielders